John Fletcher Darby (December 10, 1803May 11, 1882) was a U.S. Representative from Missouri and the fourth mayor of St. Louis.

Darby was born in Person County, North Carolina. He moved with his father to Missouri in 1818, where he worked on a farm before moving to Frankfort, Kentucky, in 1825. Thereafter, Darby studied law and was admitted to the bar. He then returned to Missouri to practice in St. Louis. He was the Mayor of St. Louis from 1835 to 1837 and 1840 to 1841, between which he served as a member of the Missouri Senate, in 1838. During his time as mayor, Darby was very active in getting the first Missouri railroad convention held in St. Louis. Eventually, that led to the incorporation of two railroads in the state. Lafayette Park was built, becoming the first city park west of the Mississippi River.

He was elected as a Whig to the Thirty-second United States Congress (March 4, 1851, to March 3, 1853), after which he returned to St. Louis and became a banker. He died near Pendleton, Missouri, on May 11, 1882, and his remains are interred at Calvary Cemetery in St. Louis.

References 

 
 
 

1803 births
1882 deaths
Mayors of St. Louis
Missouri lawyers
American bankers
Whig Party members of the United States House of Representatives from Missouri
19th-century American politicians
American lawyers admitted to the practice of law by reading law
19th-century American lawyers
19th-century American businesspeople